The Wesley Davis Three-Decker is a historic triple decker house in Worcester, Massachusetts.  It is a well-preserved example of a Stick-style building that was typical of the early phases of triple-decker construction in the city.  This house was built c. 1890; its first documented owner was Wesley Davis, a doctor who did not live in the immediate area.  Subsequent owners, like many of the building's occupants, were employed in and around local factories.  The building follows a typical side hall plan, and is noted for its porch, which extends the full height of the building over one of the front bays, and has retained all of its original decorative woodwork.

The building was listed on the National Register of Historic Places in 1990.

See also
National Register of Historic Places listings in southwestern Worcester, Massachusetts
National Register of Historic Places listings in Worcester County, Massachusetts

References

Apartment buildings in Worcester, Massachusetts
Apartment buildings on the National Register of Historic Places in Massachusetts
Queen Anne architecture in Massachusetts
Houses completed in 1890
National Register of Historic Places in Worcester, Massachusetts